Greetings to the Devil is a 2011 Colombian crime film directed by Juan Felipe Orozco. It was released in France as F.A.R.C. - L'instrument de la vengeance.

The plot concerns Angel, an amnestied FARC guerrilla whose daughter is kidnapped by one of his own former victims. The kidnapper's ultimatum is that Angel has 72 hours to eliminate his own former guerrilla unit in order to save his daughter.

Cast
 Édgar Ramírez as Ángel Sotavento
 Ricardo Vélez as Leder
 Carolina Gómez as Helena
 Salvador del Solar as Moris
 Patrick Delmas as Serge

References

External links
 

2011 films
2011 crime films
2010s Spanish-language films
Colombian crime films